The 1985 AFC U-16 Championship was the inaugural edition of the AFC U-16 Championship organized by the Asian Football Confederation (AFC), a tournament for Asian under-16 teams that also served as a qualification tournament for the 1985 FIFA U-16 World Championship to be held at China. The tournament was won by Saudi Arabia, who defeated Qatar on penalties. Both teams accompanied the already qualified China to the 1985 FIFA U-16 World Cup.

Qualification

Group stage

Group A

 Qatar vs. Japan was originally scheduled for February 3, but wasn't played.

Group B

Semifinals

Third-place match

Final

Winners

Teams qualified for 1985 FIFA U-16 World Championship
 (as host of the 1985 FIFA U-16 World Championship)

External links
RSSSF > AFC U-16 Championship > 1985

Under
International association football competitions hosted by Qatar
1985–86 in Qatari football
1985 in youth association football
February 1985 sports events in Asia